Utkhu Warqu (Quechua utkhu cotton, warqu opuntia flocossa, Hispanicized spelling Utcohuarco) is a  mountain in Peru. It is located in the Junín Region, Concepción Province, on the border of the districts of Andamarca and Comas. It is northeast of the Waytapallana mountain range. Utkhu Warqu lies north of the lake and the mountain named Putkaqucha.

References

Mountains of Peru
Mountains of Junín Region